Admiral Sir John Acworth Ommanney  (17 October 1773 – 8 July 1855) was a Royal Navy officer who went on to be Commander-in-Chief, Plymouth.

Naval career

Ommanney joined the Royal Navy in 1786. Promoted Commander in 1796, he was given command of a brig and arrested a fleet of Swedish merchant ships in the North Sea. Promoted to Post Captain in 1800, he commanded HMS Hussar, HMS Robust and then HMS Barfleur. In 1825 he took command of HMS Albion and took part in the Battle of Navarino in 1827.

He was appointed Commander-in-Chief, Lisbon in 1837 and then Second-in-Command of the Mediterranean Fleet in 1840 during the Oriental Crisis. He was made Commander-in-Chief, Plymouth in 1851. He died on 8 July 1855.

Family
In 1803, he married Frances Ayling; they had four daughters.

See also
 Northbrook Park, Farnham, Surrey

References

1773 births
1855 deaths
Royal Navy admirals
Knights Commander of the Order of the Bath
British military personnel of the Greek War of Independence#
People from Westminster
Order of Saint Louis recipients
Recipients of the Order of St. Vladimir, 3rd class
Royal Navy personnel of the French Revolutionary Wars